Davidson Andeh (born January 17, 1958) is a retired boxer from Nigeria, who won the world title in the lightweight division (– 60 kg) at the second World Amateur Championships, held in Belgrade, Yugoslavia. In the final he defeated Vladimir Sorokin from the USSR.

Andeh represented his native country at the 1976 Summer Olympics in Montreal, Quebec, Canada, but Nigeria withdrew from the competition due to the participation of New Zealand, and so the win in the first round of the featherweight division (– 57 kg) was given to India's Rai Sik.

Andeh became professional in 1980, and captured the African lightweight title in 1983 by defeating Tapsoga Tiga of Togo. He retired from competition in 1987, with a record of 18 wins (12 knockouts), five losses and one no-contest.

References

External links
 

1958 births
Living people
Lightweight boxers
Nigerian male boxers
AIBA World Boxing Championships medalists
African Boxing Union champions